A magistrates' court is a lower court where, in several jurisdictions, all criminal proceedings start. Also some civil matters may be dealt with here, such as family proceedings.

Courts
 Magistrates' court (England and Wales)
 Magistrate's Court of Jersey
 Magistrates' court (Hong Kong)
 Magistrate's courts of Israel
 Magistrate's court (South Africa)
 District Court (New Zealand), replaced magistrate's courts in 1980
 District Court (Ireland), the main court of summary jurisdiction in Ireland
 Magistrate's court (Russia)
 Magistrate's court (Sri Lanka)

Australian courts
 Magistrates Court of the Australian Capital Territory
 Magistrates court (Northern Territory)
 Magistrates Court of Queensland
 Magistrates Court of South Australia
 Magistrates Court of Tasmania
 Magistrates' Court of Victoria
 Magistrates Court of Western Australia
 Local Court of New South Wales 
 Federal Circuit Court of Australia (initially the Federal Magistrate's Court of Australia. The title Federal Magistrate was changed to Judge at the same time.)

Other
 Magistrates' Courts Act 1952 of the United Kingdom
 Magistrates' Courts Act 1980 of the United Kingdom 
 Magistrate's Court (TV series)
 Liverpool Magistrates' Court, a court building
 Bow Street Magistrates' Court
 City of Westminster Magistrates' Court

See also
 Magistrate
 Lower court
 Court of summary jurisdiction

Courts